In 2018, several massacres occurred in central Nigeria (namely Taraba and Adamawa), supposedly by Fulani herdsmen gunmen. At least 50 were killed in all.

These were in several communities across the neighbouring states.

References

2010s massacres in Nigeria
2018 murders in Nigeria